Jack Hennessy may refer to:
 John Francis Hennessy (1853–1924), Australian architect
 John Francis (Jack) Hennessy (1887–1955), his son, Australian architect
 John M. Hennessy, American financier and philanthropist
 Jack Hennessy (politician), member of the Connecticut House of Representatives

See also
 Jackie Hennessy, Irish footballer